The 1994 Miami Dolphins season was the franchise's 29th season of existence and 25th in the National Football League (NFL). On March 23, the NFL approved the transfer of majority interest in the team from the Robbie family to Wayne Huizenga.

The Dolphins improved on their 9–7 record from last year and finished 10–6. They won their second AFC East title in three years, which also meant they made the playoffs for the second time in three years. They beat the Chiefs in the Wild Card Round, 27–17. 
However, after that, the Dolphins blew a 21–6 lead and lost to the San Diego Chargers, who would make it to Super Bowl XXIX, 22–21, in the Divisional Round.

Offseason

NFL Draft

Staff

Roster

Regular season

Schedule

Game Summaries

Week 1

    
    
    
    
    
    
    
    
    
    
    

Both teams debuted new owners in Wayne Huizenga of the Dolphins and Robert Kraft of the Patriots.  The game marked the return of Dan Marino after missing most of 1993 with a torn achilles tendon.  The new-look Patriots took a 14–10 halftime lead, then in the third quarter Drew Bledsoe lobbed a 40-yard bomb caught by Ben Coates which he took in for a 63-yard touchdown.  Marino and Bledsoe passed for eight touchdowns combined, and with the Patriots leading 35–32 Marino, on 4th and 5, launched a 35-yard touchdown strike to former Patriot Irving Fryar.  The Dolphins held off New England's last-minute rally for the 39–35 win.

Week 2
Marino threw two touchdown passes during his second straight win of the season as the Dolphins, playing in Milwaukee, raced to a 24–0 lead after three quarters.  Brett Favre managed two touchdowns but it wasn't enough to prevent a 24–14 Dolphins win.

Week 3
Marino's third straight win came at home against the Jets as he threw two touchdowns while three Dolphins backs led by Terry Kirby rushed for 155 yards and touchdowns by Kirby and Bernie Parmalee.  Boomer Esiason had two touchdowns but was intercepted four times as the Dolphins won 28–14.

Week 4
The Dolphins' winning streak came to a halt at the Hubert H. Humphrey Metrodome as Warren Moon lit up the Dolphins defense with three first-half touchdowns and a 28–0 Vikings lead.  But the Dolphins began clawing back and in the fourth three Marino touchdowns and Bernie Parmalee's rushing score tied the game.  The Vikings then added another touchdown while ex-Dolphin Fuad Reveiz booted a kick that bounced off a Dolphin and thus could be recovered by the Vikings; it led to a 38-yard field goal, enough cushion to neutralize a late Keith Byars touchdown run, ensuing onside kick, and a 38–35 Vikings win.

Week 5
Dubbed the “Shula Bowl”, it marked the first time in NFL history that a head coaching matchup featured father against son. Don Shula’s Miami Dolphins defeated David Shula’s Cincinnati Bengals by a 23-7 mark, to get back on track at Riverfront Stadium. After David Klingler delivered a 51-yard touchdown to Darnay Scott the Dolphins picked him off three times while rushing for 141 yards to go with 204 Marino passing yards (89 of them to Irving Fryar) and two touchdowns.

Week 6
Persistent wind limited Marino and Jim Kelly to just 342 combined yards, a Marino touchdown to O.J. McDuffie, and a Kelly interception.   Five Bills players led by Thurman Thomas rushed for 214 yards and two scores as the Bills beat Miami (21–11) for the 14th time in the two clubs' last 17 meetings.

Week 7
Jeff Hostetler was replaced for a series by backup Vince Evans as the Raiders, despite only 227 yards of offense, forced three Miami turnovers and led 17-10 in the fourth before Keith Byars caught the tying touchdown.  The Dolphins won 20-17 on Pete Stoyanovich's 29-yard field goal in overtime.

Week 9
The offensive fireworks of Week One were not repeated as Dan Marino was intercepted twice but managed 198 yards and a touchdown while Bernie Parmalee accounted for almost all of Miami's 140 rushing yards and Keith Byars ran in a pair of scores.  Drew Bledsoe was intercepted three times as the Dolphins won 23-3.

Week 10
The Colts entered Joe Robbie Stadium beginning to build some momentum for the future, having won three of their previous five games.  The Colts clawed to a 14–6 lead after three quarters but then the Dolphins began storming back on Irving Spikes' touchdown run marred by a missed two-point conversion.  The Dolphins got the ball back but Marino was picked off by Ray Buchanan and he ran in a 28-yard touchdown, but despite this setback Marino whipped the Dolphins downfield and fired a 28-yard score to O.J. McDuffie, then the Dolphins got the ball back and Pete Stoyanovich's field goal finished off the 22–21 win from 34 yards out.

Week 11
The Bears at 5-4 came out with a trick play on a Curtis Conway touchdown throw on a fake field goal attempt.  Dan Marino was intercepted in the third but O.J. McDuffie grabbed the ball back.  The Bears led 14-6 in the fourth before Marino and Irving Fryar hooked up big, leading to a Keith Jackson touchdown catch and a two-point conversion by Aaron Craver (signed back to the Dolphins only the week earlier). The Bears booted a go-ahead field goal late (17-14 score), but the Dolphins drove down field, only to see the Bears block Pete Stoyanovich's kick at the end.

Week 12
Pittsburgh-born Marino's bomb to Fryar set up a first-quarter Keith Jackson touchdown, but Mike Tomczak erupted to 343 passing yards in a battle of field goals (four in regulation with a fatal miss by Stoyanovich in the second).  The Dolphins tied the game, but in overtime the Steelers on a 39-yarder from Gary Anderson.

Week 13

Following back-to-back losses the Dolphins appeared shellshocked as the Jets raced to a 17–0 lead.  A Marino touchdown to Mark Ingram in the third was followed by Boomer Esiason's second touchdown of the game to Johnny Mitchell.  But in the fourth everything changed; after a second Marino-to-Ingram score Esiason was intercepted and this led to a third Marino-to-Ingram touchdown; a series of fumbles led to another Esiason pick by J.B. Brown, and with two timeouts left the Dolphins had the ball with 2:34 left.  Marino drove the Dolphins to the Jets eight-yard line; at this point Marino called out "Clock! Clock! Clock!" in anticipation of spiking the ball to stop the clock – Marino, however, had worked out a trick play and was paying attention to Ingram's matchup with rookie Jets cornerback Aaron Glenn; with Ingram understanding Marino's code signal and Marino seeing a favorable matchup, Marino motioned downward as though spiking the ball, but then zipped it toward Ingram running to the front corner of the endzone where he caught it, his fourth touchdown of the game.  The stunned Jets faltered on their final drive and the Clock Play became one of the most famous finishes in NFL history.

Week 14
Despite the stunning win the 8–4 Dolphins were facing a division race where the Bills, entering at 6–6, were still in contention and the Patriots were on a late-season roll.  The Dolphins raced to a 17–7 lead on the Bills but Marino was intercepted three times and the Bills scored three touchdowns in the third quarter, then answered a fourth-quarter Marino score to Keith Jackson with Carwell Gardner's rushing score and an 83-yard bomb from Jim Kelly to Andre Reed.  With the outcome beyond saving Marino was benched and Bernie Kosar tossed a one-yard score to Scott Miller, but there was no saving a 42–31 Bills win.

Week 15
Dan Marino faced a former San Francisco 49ers quarterback, but it wasn't regular Chiefs starter Joe Montana, sidelined after a 10–9 loss to Seattle a few weeks before; instead it was Joe Cool's former backup Steve Bono, but regardless of starter the Dolphins, now 8–5 and the division race not secure yet, played like they needed the win.  The Chiefs took a 14–7 lead but Marino tied it at the half on a four-yard strike to Irving Fryar, then in the third ran in a four-yard score himself.  On the next Dolphins drive Troy Vincent caught a lateral and ran in a 56-yard touchdown; Jon Vaughn of the Chiefs then ran in the ensuing kickoff for a Chiefs touchdown. 28–21 was the closest the Chiefs came as the Dolphins scored 17 more points to win 45–28.

Week 17
The Dolphins celebrated Christmas by clinching the AFC East title.  Bernie Parmalee ran wild as he scored three touchdowns and the Dolphins led 27–10 at the half.  Two second-half Lions scores could not stop a 27–20 Dolphins win, finishing a 10–6 Dolphins record.

Standings

Playoffs

AFC wild card game

After a 17–17 tie at halftime, the Dolphins forced two turnovers in the second half to stop any Chiefs scoring threat. Both teams scored on each of their first 3 possessions of the game. Kansas City quarterback Joe Montana, playing in his last NFL game before retiring, threw two touchdowns in the first half: a 1-yard completion to tight end Derrick Walker and a 57-yarder to running back Kimble Anders. Meanwhile, Kansas City kicker Lin Elliot made a 21-yard field goal. For Miami in the first half, running back Bernie Parmalee scored a 1-yard touchdown, quarterback Dan Marino threw a 1-yard touchdown pass to tight end Ronnie Williams, and kicker Pete Stoyanovich made a 40-yard field goal.

The Dolphins then took the opening kickoff of the second half and marched 64 yards to score on wide receiver Irving Fryar's 7-yard touchdown reception. Stoyanovich then kicked a 40-yard field goal to give Miami a 27–17 lead. Early in the fourth quarter, Dolphins defensive back J.B. Brown intercepted a pass from Montana at the goal line. Then with 7:31 left in the game, Dolphins defensive back Michael Stewart wrestled the ball away from Chiefs running back Marcus Allen at the Miami 34-yard line to stop a second Kansas City scoring threat.

Montana finished his final postseason game with 314 passing yards and 2 touchdowns, with 1 interception.

Marino evened his post-season record vs. Montana at 1–1 (Montana having won Super Bowl XIX).

AFC Divisional Playoff

The Dolphins raced to a 21–6 lead at the end of the first half as Marino threw three touchdowns sandwiched around two John Carney field goals for the Chargers, but the game began turning in the third when Bernie Parmalee was brought down in the Miami endzone by Chargers defensive tackle Reuben Davis for a safety.   Natrone Means rushed for 139 yards and a 24-yard touchdown as the Dolphins offense was shut out in the second half.  Stan Humphries threw for 276 yards and despite two interceptions managed a touchdown throw to Mark Seay in the fourth quarter. Marino led Miami to San Diego's 30-yard line as time ran down, but Pete Stoyanovich badly missed on a 47-yard attempt and ended Miami's chance for victory.  The 22–21 San Diego win came thirteen years and six days after The Epic In Miami and ended Dan Marino's strong comeback season after he'd missed most of 1993 with a torn Achilles' tendon.

Awards and honors
 Dan Marino, 1994 NFL Comeback Player of the Year
 Dan Marino, 1994 UPI AFL-AFC Player of the Year
 Dan Marino, AFC Pro Bowl Selection
 Dan Marino, All-Pro Selection

Notes and references

Miami Dolphins on Pro Football Reference
Miami Dolphins on jt-sw.com

Miami
AFC East championship seasons
Miami Dolphins seasons
Miami Dolphins